Benedict Pictet (1655–1724) was a Genevan Reformed theologian.

Life
He was born at Geneva on 19 May 1655. After receiving a university education there, he made an extensive tour of Europe. He then assumed pastoral duties at Geneva, and in 1686 was appointed professor of theology. He died there on 10 January 1724, at the age of 68. Pictet was a nephew of Francis Turretin, who called him to "his bedside when dying, not his son," and Pictect preached his uncle's funeral sermon.

Works
In the area of systematic theology, Pictet published two major works:

Theologia Christiana (3 vols., Geneva, 1696; Eng. transl., Christian Theology, London, 1834, by Frederick Reyroux); and 
Morale chrétienne (2 vols., 1692).

He sought to revive the old orthodox theology, but was unable to prevent the Genevan Company of Pastors from adopting a new formula of subscription in 1706.

Pictet was also known as Christian poet, some of his hymns being included in French hymnals. Other works were Huit sermons sur L'examen des religions (3d ed., Geneva, 1716; Eng. transl., True and False Religion examined; the Christian Religion defended; and the Protestant Reformation vindicated, Edinburgh, 1797, by Archibald Bruce) and Dialogue entre un catholique et un protestant (1713; Eng. transl., Romanist Conversations, London, 1826 by Henry Huntingford).

Notes

References
https://archive.org/stream/newschaffherzog05haucgoog#page/n74/mode/2up

 Martin I. Klauber. “Family Loyalty and Theological Transition in Post-Reformation Geneva: The Case of Benedict Pictet (1655–1724).” Fides et Historia 24.1 (1992): 54–67.
 Martin I. Klauber. “Reformed Orthodoxy in Transition: Bénédict Pictet (1655–1724) and Enlightened Orthodoxy in Post-Reformation Geneva.” Later Calvinism: International Perspective 22 (1994): 94–113.

Attribution

1655 births
1724 deaths
Theologians from the Republic of Geneva
17th-century clergy from the Republic of Geneva
18th-century clergy from the Republic of Geneva
17th-century Calvinist and Reformed theologians
18th-century Calvinist and Reformed theologians